The PFL 3 mixed martial arts event for the 2021 season of the Professional Fighters League was held on May 6, 2021. This was the third regular season event of the tournament and included fights in the Heavyweight and women's Lightweight divisions. After the previous two events aired on ESPN2, this was the first event airing on ESPN.

Background
The event was headlined by a heavyweight bout, contested by the former UFC Heavyweight champion Fabrício Werdum and Renan Ferreira.

In the co-main event, the 2019 PFL Lightweight champion Kayla Harrison fought Mariana Morais.

In the second heavyweight fight of the main card, the 2019 PFL Heavyweight champion Ali Isaev was scheduled to face promotional newcomer Hatef Moeil. However, during the week of the event, it was announced that the bout was pulled due to unknown reasons and would be rescheduled for June.

Justin Willis and Denis Goltsov were expected to face each other at this event. However, Willis was pulled from the bout after the weigh-ins due to being not medically cleared and replaced by Muhammed DeReese.

Results

Aftermath 
On May 10, the New Jersey State Athletic Control Board announced that Renan Ferreira's TKO win against Fabrício Werdum was overturned to a No contest after they found that referee Keith Peterson missed a pair of taps by Ferreira that were caught on camera as Werdum applied a choke right before he lost by TKO. Due to this decision, both Werdum and Ferreria received one point in the standings.

Standings After Event
The PFL points system is based on results of the match.  The winner of a fight receives 3 points.  If the fight ends in a draw, no contest, or no decision, both fighters will receive 1 point. The bonus for winning a fight in the first, second, or third round is 3 points, 2 points, and 1 point respectively. The bonus for winning in the third round requires a fight be stopped before 4:59 of the third round.  No bonus point will be awarded if a fighter wins via decision.  For example, if a fighter wins a fight in the first round, then the fighter will receive 6 total points. A decision win will result in three total points.  If a fighter misses weight, the opponent (should they comply with weight limits) will receive 3 points due to a walkover victory, regardless of winning or losing the bout, with the fighter who missed weight being deducted 1 standings point;  if the non-offending fighter subsequently wins with a stoppage, all bonus points will be awarded. A fighter who was unable to compete for any reason, will receive a 1-point penalty (-1 point in the standings). The fighters who made weight will not receive a walkover, but will earn points and contracted purse amounts based on their performance in the altered matchup.

Heavyweight

Women's Lightweight

See also
List of PFL events
List of current PFL fighters

References

Professional Fighters League
2021 in mixed martial arts
April 2021 sports events in the United States
Events in Atlantic City, New Jersey